Kevin Tierney (August 27, 1950 – May 12, 2018) was a Canadian film producer from Montreal who co-wrote and produced the most popular Canadian film of all time at the domestic box office, Bon Cop, Bad Cop, for which he earned a Golden Reel, the Genie Award for Best Motion Picture in 2007. He is a former vice-chair of the Academy of Canadian Cinema & Television and former chair of the board of Cinémathèque québécoise.

With characters trading lines in both English and French, Tierney saw Bon Cop, Bad Cop as a normal Canadian plot line about a Sûreté du Québec cop teaming up with an Ontario Provincial Police investigator: "When I first heard the premise of this movie from Patrick Huard ... how the hell did we not already make this movie? It’s ridiculous." Tierney returned to the language theme in 2011 by directing the movie French Immersion.

Tierney also produced other titles including Varian's War, One Dead Indian, Good Neighbours and Twist. In addition to the big screen, Tierney produced several television (mini)series, including Barnum, Bonanno: The Story of a Godfather, Armistead Maupin's Tales of the City and The Memoirs of Pierre Trudeau. He also executive produced the TV movie Choice: The Henry Morgentaler Story.

Tierney also wrote an arts column in the Montreal Gazette newspaper.

In addition to professional recognition, Tierney received a Sheila and Victor Goldbloom Distinguished Community Service Award in 2013 as a community leader. At the 7th Canadian Screen Awards in 2019, he received a posthumous Board of Directors Tribute Award from the Academy of Canadian Cinema and Television.

Personal life and death
Tierney was raised in Montreal, and graduated from Concordia University and McGill University. He then taught English as a second or foreign language (ESL) in Chad and China. Tierney learned Standard French at age 24 while teaching in Algeria.

He is the father of Canadian actor and director Jacob Tierney. He produced Jacob's 2009 film The Trotsky.

Tierney died of cancer on May 12, 2018, surrounded by his family.

References

External links

1950 births
2018 deaths
20th-century Canadian screenwriters
21st-century Canadian screenwriters
Film producers from Quebec
Canadian male screenwriters
Canadian Screen Award winners
Anglophone Quebec people
Film directors from Montreal
Writers from Montreal
Quebec people of Irish descent
Canadian television producers
Deaths from cancer in Quebec
Canadian Comedy Award winners